Aleksei Ivanovich Markushevich (Алексе́й Ива́нович Маркуше́вич,, Petrozavodsk, Olonets Governorate, Russian Empire – June 7, 1979, Moscow, USSR) was a Soviet mathematician, mathematical educator, and historian of mathematics. He is known for the Farrell–Markushevich theorem.

Biography 
Aleksei Ivanovich Markushevich's father worked as a junior architect for the Olonets provincial government. In 1916 the family moved to Semipalatinsk. There in 1924 A. I. Markushevich graduated from secondary school. In 1925 he matriculated at the First Central Asian State University (now the National University of Uzbekistan). There in 1930 he graduated and was admitted to the correspondence course (education by mail) of the graduate school. In autumn 1931 he became a graduate student in the Research Institute of Mechanics and Mathematics, Moscow State University. There he received in 1934 his Aspirantur (similar to a PhD) under the supervision of Mikhail Lavrentyev, became at the beginning of 1935 a senior researcher, and became in 1938 an associate professor. At Moscow State University, Markushevich received in 1944 his Russian Doctor of Sciences degree (habilitation) and in 1946 became a full professor, retaining that academic position until his death.

Markushevich was elected in 1945 a corresponding member and in 1950 a full member of Академии педагогических наук РСФСР (Academy of Pedagogical Sciences, Russian Soviet Federative Socialist Republic). For that academy he served as vice-president from 1950 to 1958 and again from 1964 to 1967. From 1958 to 1964 he was the primary deputy minister of education of the Russian Soviet Federative Socialist Republic.

In Академии педагогических наук СССР (Academy of Pedagogical Sciences of the USSR), he was elected a full member in 1967 and served as its vice-president from 1967 to 1975.

In 1978 he was an Invited Speaker at the International Congress of Mathematicians (ICM) in Helsinki.

The last years of his life were overshadowed by a scandal related to the theft of medieval European manuscripts from Российский государственный архив древних актов, РГАДА / RGADA (Russian State Archives of Ancient Documents; investigations revealed that the main buyer of the stolen documents was A. I. Markushevich.

He was buried in Moscow at the Kuntsevo Cemetery (section 10).

Mathematical research
Markushevich's mathematical research deals mainly with complex analysis, conformal mapping, and approximation theory. He published a series of papers on approximation, interpolation, and completeness; the papers contributed to the pioneering methods of functional analysis, in particular the theory of linear spaces, which began to be widely used in the theory of analytic functions.

Book publishing activities
He was head of the editorial office of mathematics of the Soviet Издательство технико-теоретической литературы (Publishing House of Technical and Theoretical Literature) from 1934 to 1937 and again from 1943 to 1947.

He initiated and participated in the publication of the series of books  (Popular Lectures on Mathematics) published in 62 volumes from 1950 to 1992 and the series of books Библиотека учителя (Teacher's Library).

From 1951 to 1952 and from 1963 to 1966, he was among the initiators and editors of Энциклопедия элементарной математики (Encyclopedia of Elementary Mathematics).

Markushevich was keenly interested in the history of books. Beginning in the 1940s he collected old books of historical interest. In 1976, he donated his collection of incunables  to the State Library of the USSR named after V.I. Lenin.

Educational reform
During the 1960s and 1970s Markushevich was a leading supporter of reforming the teaching of mathematics in Soviet schools. In the 1960s, he took part in the creation of new school textbooks on mathematics, developed the pedagogical theory of school textbooks, and worked on improving the training of school mathematics teachers. He was the chair of the joint commission of the Academy of Sciences of the USSR and the Academy of Pedagogical Sciences of the USSR, which determined the content of education in secondary schools.

Selected publications

Articles
 Die Arbeiten von C. F. Gauß über Funktionentheorie. (The works of C. F. Gauss on complex analysis) In: Hans Reichardt (ed.): C. F. Gauss. Gedenkband anlässlich des 100. Todestages am 23. Februar 1955. Teubner, Leipzig 1957, pp. 151–182.
 A. N. Kolmogorov, A. P. Yushkevich (eds.), B. L. Laptev, B. A. Rosenfel'd, A. I. Markushevich: Mathematics of the 19th Century. Geometry, analytic function theory. Birkhäuser, Basel 1996. Markushevich contributed the section Analytic Function Theory.

Books
 Theory of Analytic Functions. Hindustan Publishing Co., Delhi, 1963. (translation of 1961 Russian edition, revised from the 1944 Russian edition)
 Skizzen zur Geschichte der analytischen Funktionen (Sketches on the history of analytic functions) (= Hochschulbücher für Mathematik. vol. 16). Deutscher Verlag der Wissenschaften, Berlin 1955.
 Theory of functions of a complex variable. 3 vols. Prentice-Hall, 1965–1967
  (1 volume abridgment of the 3 volumes translated by Richard A. Silverman)
 Entire Functions. American Elsevier, 1966, 105 pages (translated from the 1965 Russian edition);  (ebook)
 The Remarkable Sine Functions. American Elsevier, 1966 (translated from 1965 Russian edition);  (ebook)
  (ebook translated from the 1979 Russian edition by G. Bluher)

References

External links

1908 births
1979 deaths
National University of Uzbekistan alumni
Moscow State University alumni
Academic staff of Moscow State University
Soviet mathematicians
20th-century Russian mathematicians
Complex analysts
Mathematical analysts
Historians of mathematics
Burials at Kuntsevo Cemetery